Henry Sylvester Cornwell (1831-June 15, 1886) was an American physician and poet. 
 
Cornwell was a native of New London, Conn.  He was one of a family of nine children, in humble circumstances, and for many years before his professional education he was a workman in a manufactory in New London. He graduated from Yale Medical School in 1863. Returning to New London after graduation, he soon acquired a lucrative practice, but failing health (from consumption) prevented him from making the most of his powers. He early became known as a poet and his occasional contributions to the local papers had more than a merely local reputation. He published one volume of his pieces, The Land of Dreams, and Other Poems (New London, 1878, 12mo.)

Cornwell died in New London, June 15, 1886, aged 51 years. The immediate cause of his death was an ulcer in the stomach.

External links
 
 
 The Land of Dreams
 Henry Sylvester Cornwell, poet of fancy; a memoir, by Ella Morgan Frisbie

1831 births
1886 deaths
Writers from New London, Connecticut
Yale School of Medicine alumni
19th-century American physicians
American male poets